Pterolophia coenosa is a species of beetle in the family Cerambycidae. It was described by Masaki Matsushita in 1953.

References

coenosa
Beetles described in 1953